Sir Frederick Wilfrid Scott Stokes,  (9 April 1860 – 7 February 1927)  was the inventor in 1915 of the Stokes Mortar, which saw extensive use in the latter half of the First World War and was one of the first truly portable mortars.

Stokes was born on 9 April 1860 in Liverpool, the son of Scott Nasmyth Stokes, a school inspector. He was educated at St. Francis Xavier's College and the Catholic University College, Kensington.

Following an apprenticeship with the Great Western Railway, he eventually became an assistant to William Shelford working on the designs for bridges for the Hull and Barnsley Railway.

A civil engineer by trade, Stokes was appointed chairman and managing director of Ransomes & Rapier, an engineering company based in Ipswich, which manufactured cranes. Between 1915 and 1918 Stokes worked for the Inventions Branch of the Ministry of Munitions where he invented the Stokes Mortar. The trench mortar was first used in 1915 during the Battle of Loos to fire a smoke shell. At first it was not liked but as the construction was improved it was widely used and eventually produced in two sizes.  This mortar continued in use, its effectiveness being improved again and again by other British engineers.

Stokes received a knighthood in 1917 for inventing the mortar which was named for him. He was also given several forms of monetary reward by the Ministry of Munitions for his invention including royalties of £1 per Stokes mortar bomb.

Stokes married Iren Ionides in 1899. He is buried at St Mary Magdalen Roman Catholic Church, Mortlake.

His brother Leonard Stokes was an architect. His nephew Richard Stokes was a Labour MP and minister.

See also
Stokes Mortar

References

External links

1860 births
1927 deaths
British people of World War I
British inventors
English civil engineers
Knights Commander of the Order of the British Empire
Engineers from Liverpool
Weapon designers
Burials at St Mary Magdalen Roman Catholic Church Mortlake